"Beam Me Up, Scotty" is the second single released in 1988 by the Washington, D.C.-based hip-hop artist D.C. Scorpio. This single following his debut single Stone Cold Hustler. The song also appears on the 1988 compilation album The Go Go Posse.

Track listing

Side-A
"Beam Me Up, Scotty" (radio version) – 3:49  
"Beam Me Up, Scotty" (long version) – 5:20  
"Beam Me Up, Scotty" (DC super dub) – 5:40

Side-B
"Beam Me Up, Scotty" (NYC mix) – 5:15  
"Beam Me Up, Scotty" (NYC instrumental mix) – 5:09  
"Beam Me Up, Scotty" (NYC club dub) – 4:15

See also
Hip hop in Washington, D.C.

References

External links
"Beam Me Up, Scotty" at Discogs

1988 singles
Go-go songs
American hip hop songs
1988 songs